The 2016 NCAA Division I Outdoor Track and Field Championships were the 95th NCAA Men's Division I Outdoor Track and Field Championships and the 35th NCAA Women's Division I Outdoor Track and Field Championships held for the fourth consecutive year at Hayward Field in Eugene, Oregon on the campus of the University of Oregon. In total, forty-two different men's and women's track and field events were contested from June 8 to June 11, 2016.

Results

Men's events

100 meters
Only top eight final results shown; no prelims are listed
Wind: -2.3 mps

200 meters
Only top eight final results shown; no prelims are listed
Wind: -0.2 mps

400 meters
Only top eight final results shown; no prelims are listed

800 meters
Only top eight final results shown; no prelims are listed

1500 meters
Only top eight final results shown; no prelims are listed

5000 meters
Only top eight final results shown; no prelims are listed

10000 meters
Only top eight final results shown; no prelims are listed

110 meters hurdles
Only top eight final results shown; no prelims are listed
Wind: -0.9 mps

400 meters hurdles
Only top eight final results shown; no prelims are listed

3000 meters steeplechase
Only top eight final results shown; no prelims are listed

4 x 100 meters relay
Only top eight final results shown; no prelims are listed

4 x 400 meters relay
Only top eight final results shown; no prelims are listed

Long Jump
Only top eight final results shown; no prelims are listed

Triple Jump
Only top eight final results shown; no prelims are listed

High Jump
Only top eight final results shown; no prelims are listed

Pole Vault
Only top eight final results shown; no prelims are listed

Shot Put
Only top eight final results shown; no prelims are listed

Discus throw
Only top eight final results shown; no prelims are listed

Javelin throw
Only top eight final results shown; no prelims are listed

Hammer throw
Only top eight final results shown; no prelims are listed

Decathlon
Only top eight final results shown; no prelims are listed

Women's events

Women's 100 meters
Only top eight final results shown; no prelims are listed
Wind: +2.6 mps

Women's 200 meters
Only top eight final results shown; no prelims are listed
Wind: +1.9 mps

Women's 400 meters
Only top eight final results shown; no prelims are listed

Women's 800 meters
Only top eight final results shown; no prelims are listed

Women's 1500 meters
Only top eight final results shown; no prelims are listed

Women's 5000 meters
Only top eight final results shown; no prelims are listed

Women's 10000 meters
Only top eight final results shown; no prelims are listed

Women's 100 meters hurdles
Only top eight final results shown; no prelims are listed
Wind: +3.8 mps

Women's 400 meters hurdles
Only top eight final results shown; no prelims are listed

Women's 3000 meters steeplechase
Only top eight final results shown; no prelims are listed

Women's 4 x 100 meters relay
Only top eight final results shown; no prelims are listed

Women's 4 x 400 meters relay
Only top eight final results shown; no prelims are listed

Women's Long Jump
Only top eight final results shown; no prelims are listed

Women's Triple Jump

Only top eight final results shown; no prelims are listed

Women's High Jump
Only top eight final results shown; no prelims are listed

Women's Pole Vault
Only top eight final results shown; no prelims are listed

Women's Shot Put
Only top eight final results shown; no prelims are listed

Women's Discus throw
Only top eight final results shown; no prelims are listed

Women's Javelin Throw
Only top eight final results shown; no prelims are listed

Women's Hammer Throw
Only top eight final results shown; no prelims are listed

Women's Heptathlon
Only top eight final results shown; no prelims are listed

Standings

Men
Only top ten teams shown

Women
Only top ten teams shown

See also
 NCAA Men's Division I Outdoor Track and Field Championships 
 NCAA Women's Division I Outdoor Track and Field Championships

References

NCAA Men's Outdoor Track and Field Championship
NCAA Division I Outdoor Track and Field Championships
NCAA Division I Outdoor Track and Field Championships
NCAA Women's Outdoor Track and Field Championship